Queensbury Academy may refer to:

 Queensbury Academy, Dunstable, England
 Trinity Academy Bradford, England, formerly known as Queensbury Academy

See also 
 Queensbury School (disambiguation)
 Queensbury (disambiguation)